The canton of Calais-Centre is a former canton situated in the department of the Pas-de-Calais and in the Nord-Pas-de-Calais region of northern France. It was disbanded following the French canton reorganisation which came into effect in March 2015. It consisted of 3 communes, which joined the canton of Calais-2 in 2015. It had a total of 27,832 inhabitants (2012).

Geography 
The canton is organised around Calais in the arrondissement of Calais.

The canton comprised 3 communes:
Les Attaques
Calais (partly)
Coulogne

See also 
Cantons of Pas-de-Calais 
Communes of Pas-de-Calais 
Arrondissements of the Pas-de-Calais department

References

Former cantons of Pas-de-Calais
Canton of Calais Centre
2015 disestablishments in France
States and territories disestablished in 2015